Chad Allen (born June 5, 1974) is an American retired actor and psychologist. Beginning his career at the age of seven, Allen is a three-time Young Artist Award winner and GLAAD Media Award honoree. He was a teen idol during the late 1980s as David Witherspoon on the NBC family drama Our House and as Zach Nichols on the NBC sitcom My Two Dads before transitioning to an adult career as Matthew Cooper on the CBS western drama Dr. Quinn: Medicine Woman. He announced his retirement from acting in April 2015.

Early life
Allen was born Chad Allen Lazzari on June 5, 1974, in Cerritos, California, and grew up in Artesia. He has a twin sister named Charity and a brother named Steve Lazzari who works for Union Pacific Railroad. Allen is of predominantly Italian origin, with a "dose" of German origin. He was raised in a "strict" Roman Catholic household and regards himself as being a "deeply spiritual person" because of his upbringing. Allen attended St. John Bosco High School in Bellflower, California.

Career
Allen guest-starred on several prime time series, including an early episode of Airwolf for which he was nominated as "Best Young Actor: Guest in a Series" at the 6th Youth in Film Awards and St. Elsewhere, in which he played autistic child Tommy Westphall (1983–88). The series final episode, "The Last One", ends with the indication that all of its storylines occurred in Tommy's imagination. In 1983, he appeared on Cutter to Houston, playing "a kid who got hurt and had to be given mouth-to-mouth and carried to the waiting chopper by Dr. Hal Wexler (Alec Baldwin)". "I thought it was the greatest job I had ever gotten," he later stated. Allen's first regular role was as David Witherspoon on Our House (1986–88). In 1989–90, he had a recurring role as Zach in My Two Dads. Allen's next contract role was Matthew Cooper in Dr. Quinn, Medicine Woman alongside Jane Seymour (1993–98). During the final season of his run on St. Elsewhere, Allen was teamed with his sister Charity Allen on an episode of NBC's Saturday morning children's game show I'm Telling!.

Starting with Third Man Out (2005), Allen stars as Donald Strachey, a gay private detective in a monogamous relationship, in a series of television movies for the here! network based on novels by Richard Stevenson. The sequel, Shock to the System (2006), was followed by On the Other Hand, Death (2008) and Ice Blues (2008). Allen noted that Strachey is the first gay character he had ever played outside of theater and that, though his career is "different" since coming out, he finds it "more interesting and fun for me than it has ever been."

When Allen was cast as real-life Christian missionary Nate Saint in the docudrama End of the Spear (2006) some conservative Christians lashed out at producers for casting an openly gay man in the role.

In 2007, Allen starred in the film Save Me. Developed and produced by Allen, the film was directed by Robert Cary and written by Robert Desiderio. Save Me, a film exploring the ex-gay movement, premiered at the 2007 Sundance Film Festival and was later picked up for distribution by independent studio Fine Line Features.

From June through August 2008, Allen appeared with Valerie Harper in Looped, a play based on the life of Tallulah Bankhead, at the Pasadena Playhouse in Pasadena, California.

Starting on September 23, 2008, Allen portrayed the love interest of Dr. Kyle Julian for five episodes of the prime time SOAPnet serial General Hospital: Night Shift, a spin-off of the ABC Daytime soap opera General Hospital.

In April 2015, Allen confirmed in a YouTube video that he had quit his acting career to become a clinical psychologist.

Personal life
In 1996, at age 21, Allen was outed as gay when the U.S. tabloid The Globe published photos of him kissing another man in a hot tub at a party. The photos were sold by someone who claimed to be a friend of the couple. Allen has since become an activist for the LGBT community in addition to his continuing acting and producing career. On January 17, 2006, Allen appeared on CNN's Larry King Live with San Francisco mayor Gavin Newsom to represent his viewpoint in a debate over same-sex marriage. Allen thanked Newsom for his attempts to legalize same-sex marriage in the city. Allen has been featured in The Advocate magazine multiple times and has appeared on three of its covers.

In November 2006, The Los Angeles Daily News wrote in passing that Allen's partner, Jeremy Glazer, was also in the film Save Me. In a September 2008 interview with Out.com, Allen stated that he was currently in a three-year relationship and had been sober for eight years. In October 2008, AfterElton.com stated his boyfriend to be Glazer. In May 2009, Allen was the recipient of a GLAAD Media Award: the Davidson/Valentini Award. In his acceptance speech he said he had met Glazer, his partner, exactly four years earlier. They broke up in 2015.

Allen graduated from University of California, Los Angeles in June 2015 with a Bachelor of Arts in Psychology. He graduated from the Psy.D. Program in Clinical Psychology at Antioch University, New England in 2020.

Filmography

References

Further reading
 Dye, David. Child and Youth Actors: Filmography of Their Entire Careers, 1914-1985. Jefferson, NC: McFarland & Co., 1988, p. 5.
 Lazzari, C. A. (2020). Separating Rope Strands: An Unraveling of Shame in Gay Men. https://aura.antioch.edu/etds/590

External links

1974 births
Living people
21st-century American psychologists
20th-century American male actors
21st-century American male actors
Male actors from California
American male child actors
American child models
American male film actors
American people of German descent
American people of Italian descent
American male stage actors
American male television actors
American gay actors
LGBT people from California
American LGBT rights activists
People from Cerritos, California
American twins
Activists from California
21st-century American LGBT people
LGBT psychologists